Frank Charles Clement (15 June 1886 – 15 February 1970) was a British racing driver who, along with Canadian John Duff, won the 1924 24 Hours of Le Mans.

Career
One of the "Bentley Boys", Clement was recruited by W.O. Bentley as a test driver for Bentley Motors. The only British team in the event, the pair finished the race in fourth after fighting for the lead for much of the race. The following year Duff returned with his private Bentley and the two won the race outright over several Lorraine-Dietrichs and Chenard-Walckers.

However, their car would fail halfway through the event and would not be able to finish. Bentley improved to a three car team for 1926, and Clement was assigned to co-drive with George Duller, although once again the car was not able to finish. Over the next two years, although Bentley won Le Mans two more times, Clement's car still was unable to finish the endurance event. In  Clement once again was able to last the entire event as Bentley dominated, earning the top four finishing positions.

Racing record

Complete 24 Hours of Le Mans results

External links 
Frank Clement at racingsportscars.com.

1886 births
1970 deaths
Bentley Boys
English racing drivers
24 Hours of Le Mans drivers
24 Hours of Le Mans winning drivers
Royal Engineers soldiers